The 2015–16 South Carolina Gamecocks men's basketball team represented the University of South Carolina during the 2015–16 NCAA Division I men's basketball season. The team's head coach was Frank Martin who was in his fourth season at South Carolina. The team played their home games at Colonial Life Arena in Columbia, South Carolina as a member of the Southeastern Conference. They finished the season 25–9, 11–7 in SEC play to finish in a three-way tie for third place. They lost in the quarterfinals of the SEC tournament to Georgia. They were invited to the National Invitation Tournament where they defeated High Point in the first round to advance to the second round where they lost to Georgia Tech.

Previous season
The Gamecocks finished the season 17–16, 6–12 in SEC play to finish in a tie for 11th place. They advanced to the quarterfinals of the SEC tournament where they lost to Georgia.

Departures

Recruits

Roster

Schedule
Source: 

|-
!colspan=9 style="background:#73000A; color:#FFFFFF;"| Exhibition

|-
!colspan=9 style="background:#73000A; color:#FFFFFF;"| Non-conference games

|-
!colspan=9 style="background:#73000A; color:#FFFFFF;"| SEC regular season

|-
!colspan=9 style="background:#73000A; color:#FFFFFF;" | SEC Tournament

|-
!colspan=9 style="background:#73000A; color:#FFFFFF;" | NIT

Rankings

Awards

See also
2015–16 South Carolina Gamecocks women's basketball team

References

South Carolina Gamecocks men's basketball seasons
South Carolina
South Carolina
Game
Game